Poppa may refer to:

 Poppa, fictional character in Starlight Express 
 Poppa of Bayeux, the Christian wife or mistress of the Viking conqueror Rollo

See also